(born 28 June 1985) is a Japanese singer, songwriter and actress. After signing with Avex Trax, Nakamura released her debut single, "Yogoreta Shitagi" in 2006. She attracted public attention after coming out as a transgender woman publicly via her official website on 11 September 2006.

Nakamura's second single "Tomodachi no Uta", which details her struggling with the sexuality and unrequited love for her friend, became her breakthrough hit, reaching number nine in Japan. Her debut studio album, Ten Made Todoke, was released in January 2007 and certificated Gold by Recording Industry Association of Japan. Her fourth studio album Shōnen Shōjo (2010) won the 52nd Japan Record Awards for Excellence Album Award. In May 2011, Nakamura released her first compilation album, Wakage no Itari.

Early life
Ataru Nakamura was born on 28 June 1985, in Sumida, Tokyo. Her parents divorced when she was little, and she was raised by her mother. Nakamura began studying music early in her life, teaching herself to play the piano at the age of ten, and beginning to write her own songs at fifteen.

Music career

2004–2005: Switch to Avex Trax and Ten Made Todoke era
In 2006, she switched to a major label, the popular Avex Trax. Her first major label single, "Yogoreta Shitagi", was released on her birthday, and received minor attention.  "Yogoreta Shitagi" was written about an ex-boyfriend who was cheating on her and is written from the former boyfriend's point of view. Nakamura called this individual on the telephone to explain that the song she had written about him was to be her debut single.

Her second single, "Tomodachi no Uta", received greater attention, and placed at number 150 on the Oricon charts. However, it was not until Nakamura came out as a transgender female that she received major attention. Her explanation garnered a lot of media attention, and her single rose to number 9 on the Oricon charts.  "Tomodachi no Uta" became the theme song for the popular television drama Watashi ga Watashi de Aru Tame ni, a primetime television drama about a young transsexual woman. Nakamura even received a small cameo appearance on the program.

Nakamura wrote "Tomodachi no Uta" when she was fourteen years old; notably, it was the first song she ever wrote. She wrote the song to say goodbye to the friends in junior high she would never see again. "Tomodachi no Uta" was featured in an Avex Trax musical titled "Kokoro no Kakera". The soundtrack featured 21 songs chosen from the company's hits over the past two decades.

Her third single, "Watashi no Naka no Ii Onna", entered the Oricon charts at number 39. On the same day "Watashi no Naka no Ii Onna" was released, the song "Chewing Gum" written by Nakamura for the band AAA, debuted on the Oricon chart. Her two songs competed with one another for four weeks.

Her first album, Ten Made Todoke, was released on 1 January 2007. A month later, she released "Kaze ni Naru", her fourth single. "Kaze ni Naru" was the theme song for the film Sakebi.

Her song "Kakeashi no Ikizama" was used as the closing theme for the anime series Reideen.

Late 2007–2008: Watashi wo Daite Kudasai era
Nakamura's fifth single marked the promotion of her second album titled Watashi wo Daite Kudasai. The album was released on 5 December 2007. "Ringo Uri", the album's first single, premiered on 27 June 2007, and peaked at number 30 on the Oricon charts. The album's second single, "Hadaka Denkyū", premiered on 21 November. "Tori no Mure", the album's third single and her seventh overall, received minor airplay.

2009: Ashita wa Haremasu You Ni era
"Kaze Tachinu" debuted on 9 July 2008. The song was used as the theme song for the live-action film GeGeGe no Kitaro Sennen Noroi Uta. The single did well and was received much like "Tomodachi no Uta". Nakamura appeared at AP Bank Fes' 08, a musical festival, on 20 July 2008, to promote the single.

Nakamura released "Kotonakare Shugi", a rock song produced by Kameda Seiji, on 17 December 2008.

She wrote a song called "Hare-butai" for Jero, Japan's first black enka singer.

Ashita wa Haremasu You Ni was Nakamura's third studio album, released on 25 February 2009 in both standard and deluxe editions, the latter containing a DVD containing various performances and music videos.

2010: Shōnen Shōjo era

In 2010 Ataru Nakamura switched her management from Avex Trax to Yamaha Music Communications. She released the single "Iede Shoujo," which debuted at No. 90 on the Oricon charts and sold 796 copies the first week. On 9/22 her album came out titled Shōnen Shōjo it debuted at No. 65 on the Oricon and sold 2,103 copies the first week. The album was later awarded a Japan Record Award, despite its lack of commercial success.

Personal life
Nakamura was assigned male at birth but transitioned after struggling with issues of gender identity. This was mentioned in her official biography short during her appearance at the 2007 Kouhaku Uta Gassen.

Musical style
Nakamura is notable for the two different styles in which she sings. Her first style is a modern rock/pop sound. Her second style is an enka-inspired sound; thus far her enka-styled ballads have been her largest successes. Her singles have thus far alternated between these two styles.

Discography

Studio albums

Compilation albums

Extended plays

Singles

Promotional singles

Filmography
 Hazard Lamp (2022)

Notes

References

External links
Ataru Nakamura Official website

1985 births
Avex Group artists
Japanese LGBT songwriters
Japanese women composers
Japanese actresses
Japanese women pop singers
Japanese-language singers
Japanese multi-instrumentalists
Japanese women singer-songwriters
Japanese singer-songwriters
Japanese pianists
Japanese women pianists
Transgender composers
Japanese LGBT singers
Transgender songwriters
Singers from Tokyo
Transgender women musicians
Living people
21st-century Japanese singers
21st-century Japanese women singers
21st-century Japanese pianists
21st-century LGBT people
21st-century women pianists
Transgender singers